Explorations is an album by Argentine composer, pianist and conductor Lalo Schifrin and American drummer Louis Bellson recorded in 1964 and released on the Roulette label. It was the first album composed entirely by Schifrin and features themes that would later be used in the television detective series Mannix.

Track listing
All compositions by Lalo Schifrin 
 "Variations" - 3:19   
 "Primitive" - 5:27   
 "Explorations" - 5:15   
 "Cycles" - 2:15   
 "Ostinato" - 6:24   
 "Etude for Tympani and Strings" - 5:10   
 "Toledano" - 4:45  
Recorded in Los Angeles on February 10 & 1, 1964

Personnel
Lalo Schifrin - arranger, conductor
Louis Bellson - drums, tympani, log drum, percussion 
Artie Kane - keyboards
Alton Hendrickson - guitar
Keith Mitchell - bass
Erno Neufeld, Anatol Kaminsky, David Frisina, Sam Freed, Nathan Kaproff, George Kast, Alex Murray, Marvin Limonick - violin
Sanford Schonbach, Virginia Majewski - viola
Raphael Kramer, Eleanor Slatkin - cello
Dorothy Remsen - harp
Bobby Helfer - orchestra manager

References

Lalo Schifrin albums
Louie Bellson albums
Albums produced by Teddy Reig
1964 albums
Albums arranged by Lalo Schifrin
Roulette Records albums